Barringtonia maxwelliana is a species of woody plant in the Lecythidaceae family. It is endemic to Bukit Larut (Maxwell Hill) in Perak, Malaysia. It can be found on steep ridges and hillsides in submontane forests, at about 600 m. It is threatened by habitat loss.

References

maxwelliana
Endemic flora of Peninsular Malaysia
Trees of Peninsular Malaysia
Vulnerable plants
Taxonomy articles created by Polbot